Loralai District is a district in the northeast of Balochistan province of Pakistan. Loralai town is the district headquarters.

Demographics
At the time of the 2017 census the district had a population of 244,446, of which 130,484 were males and 113,950 females. Rural population was 189,597 (77.56%) while the urban population was 54,849 (22.44%). The literacy rate was 42.42% - the male literacy rate was 56.99% while the female literacy rate was 25.46%. 1,201 people in the district were from religious minorities.

At the time of the 2017 census, 93.29% of the population spoke Pashto, 1.68% Saraiki, 1.48% Balochi and 1.31% Punjabi as their first language.

Education 
 University of Loralai
According to the Pakistan District Education Rankings, district Loralai is ranked at number 97 out of the 141 ranked districts in Pakistan on the education score index. This index considers learning, gender parity and retention in the district.

Literacy rate in 2014–15 of population 10 years and older in the district stands at 44% whereas for females it is only 22%.

Post primary access is a major issue in the district with 89% schools being at primary level. Compare this with high schools which constitute only 3% of government schools in the district. This is also reflected in the enrolment figures for 2016–17 with 12,192 students enrolled in class 1 to 5 and only 586 students enrolled in class 9 and 10.

Gender disparity is another issue in the district. Only 28% schools in the district are girls’ schools. Access to education for girls is a major issue in the district and is also reflected in the low literacy rates for females.

Moreover, the schools in the district lack basic facilities. According to Alif Ailaan district education rankings 2017, the district is ranked at number 135 out of the 155 districts of Pakistan for primary school infrastructure. At the middle school level, it is ranked at number 137 out of the 155 districts. These rankings take into account the basic facilities available in schools including drinking water, working toilet, availability of electricity, existence of a boundary wall and general building condition. 7 out of 10 schools do not have electricity in them. 3 out of 4 schools lack a toilet and more than half the schools do not have a boundary wall. 2 out of 5 schools do not have clean drinking water.

References

Bibliography

External links

 Loralai District at 

 
Districts of Balochistan, Pakistan